Enochian is an occult constructed language — said by its originators to have been received from angels — recorded in the private journals of John Dee and his colleague Edward Kelley in late 16th-century England. Kelley was a scryer who worked with Dee in his magical investigations. The language is integral to the practice of Enochian magic.

The language found in Dee's and Kelley's journals encompasses a limited textual corpus. Linguist Donald Laycock, an Australian Skeptic, studied the Enochian journals, and argues against any extraordinary features. The untranslated texts of the Liber Loagaeth manuscript recall the patterns of glossolalia rather than true language. Dee did not distinguish the Liber Loagaeth material from the translated language of the Calls, which is more like an artificial language. This language was called Angelical by Dee and later came to be referred to as 'Enochian' by subsequent writers. The phonology and grammar resemble English, though the translations are not sufficient to work out any regular morphology. Some Enochian words resemble words and proper names in the Bible, but most have no apparent etymology.

Dee's journals also refer to this language as "Celestial Speech", "First Language of God-Christ", "Holy Language", or "Language of Angels". He also referred to it as "Adamical" because, according to Dee's angels, it was used by Adam in Paradise to name all things. The term "Enochian" comes from Dee's assertion that the Biblical patriarch Enoch had been the last human (before Dee and Kelley) to know the language.

History 

According to Tobias Churton in his text The Golden Builders, the concept of an Angelic or antediluvian language was common during Dee's time. If one could speak the language of angels, it was believed one could directly interact with them.

Seeking contact and reported visions 
In 1581, Dee mentioned in his personal journals that God had sent "good angels" to communicate directly with prophets. In 1582, Dee teamed up with the seer Edward Kelley, although Dee had used several other seers previously. With Kelley's help as a scryer, Dee set out to establish lasting contact with the angels. Their work resulted, among other things, in the reception of Angelical, now more commonly known as Enochian.

The reception started on March 26, 1583, when Kelley reported visions in the crystal of a 21 lettered alphabet. A few days later, Kelley started receiving what became the book Liber Loagaeth ("Book [of] Speech from God"). The book consists of 49 great letter tables, or squares made of 49 by 49 letters (however each table has a front and a back side, making 98 tables of 49×49 letters altogether). Dee and Kelley said the angels never translated the texts in this book.

Receiving the Angelic Keys 
About a year later, at the court of King Stephen Báthory in Kraków, where both alchemists stayed for some time, another set of texts was reportedly received through Kelley. These texts comprise 48 poetic verses with English translations, which in Dee's manuscripts are called , or Angelic Keys. Dee was apparently intending to use these Keys to open the "Gates of Understanding" represented by the magic squares in Liber Loagaeth:

Phonology and writing system 
The language was recorded primarily in Latin script, however, individual words written in Enochian script "appear sporadically throughout the manuscripts". There are 21 letters in the script; one letter appears with or without a diacritic dot. Dee mapped these letters of the "Adamical alphabet" onto 22 of the letters of the English alphabet, treating U and V as positional variants (as was common at the time) and omitting the English letters J, K, and W. The Enochian script is written from right to left in John Dee's diary. Different documents have slightly different forms of the script. The alphabet also shares many graphical similarities to a script, also attributed to the prophet Enoch, that appeared in the Voarchadumia Contra Alchimiam of Johannes Pantheus, a copy of which Dee is known to have owned.

The phonology of Enochian is "thoroughly English", apart from difficult sequences such as bdrios, excolphabmartbh, longamphlg, lapch, etc. Laycock mapped Enochian orthography to its sound system and says, "the resulting pronunciation makes it sound much more like English than it looks at first sight". However, the difficult strings of consonants and vowels in words such as ooaona, paombd, smnad and noncf are the kind of pattern one gets by joining letters from a text together in an arbitrary pattern. As Laycok notes, "The reader can test this by taking, for example, every tenth letter on this page, and dividing the string of letters into words. The 'text' created will tend to look rather like Enochian."

Alphabet
The Enochian letters, with their letter names and English equivalents as given by Dee, and pronunciations as reconstructed by Laycock, are as follows. Modern pronunciation conventions vary, depending on the affiliations of the practitioner.

A number of fonts for the Enochian script are available. They use the ASCII range, with the letters assigned to the codepoints of their English equivalents.

Grammar

Morphology 
The grammar is for the most part without articles or prepositions. Adjectives are quite rare. Aaron Leitch identifies several affixes in Enochian, including -o (indicating 'of') and -ax (which functions like -ing in English). Leitch observes that, unlike English, Enochian appears to have a vocative case, citing Dee's note in the margin of the First Table of Loagaeth – "Befes the vocative case of Befafes".

Compounds 
Compounds are frequent in the Enochian corpus. Modifiers and indicators are typically compounded with the nouns and verbs modified or indicated. These compounds can occur with demonstrative pronouns and conjunctions, as well as with various forms of the verb 'to be'. The compounding of nouns with adjectives or other verbs is less common. Compounds may exhibit variant spellings of the words combined.

Conjugation 
Conjugation can result in spelling changes which can appear to be random or haphazard. Due to this, Aaron Leitch has expressed doubt as to whether Enochian actually has conjugations. The very scant evidence of Enochian verb conjugation seems quite reminiscent of English, including the verb 'to be' which is highly irregular.

Laycock reports that the largest number of forms are recorded for 'be' and for goh- 'say':

{|
!'to be'
|-
|zir, zirdo || I am
|-
|geh || thou art
|-
|i || he/she/it is
|-
|chiis, chis, chiso || they are
|-
|as, zirop || was
|-
|zirom || were
|-
|trian || shall be
|-
|christeos || let there be
|-
|bolp || be thou!
|-
|ipam || is not
|-
|ipamis || cannot be
|}

Note that christeos 'let there be' might be from 'Christ', and if so is not part of a conjugation.

For negation of verbs, two constructions are attested: e.g. chis ge 'are not' (chis 'they are') and ip uran 'not see' (uran 'see').

Pronouns 
While Enochian does have personal pronouns, they are rare and used in ways that can be difficult to understand. Relative possessive pronouns do exist but are used sparingly.

Attested personal pronouns (Dee's material only):

{|
| ol || I, me, my, myself
|-
| il, ils, yls, ylsi || thou, thee
|-
| q ([kwɑ]) || thy
|-
| tia || his
|-
| tox || of him, his
|-
| pi || she
|-
| tlb = tilb, tbl ([tibl]) || her, of her
|-
| tiobl || in her
|-
| t ([ti]) || it
|}

Demonstrative pronouns: oi 'this', unal 'these, those', priaz(i) 'those'.

Syntax 
Word order closely follows English, except for the dearth of articles and prepositions. Adjectives, although rare, typically precede the noun as in English.

Vocabulary and corpus 
Laycock notes that there are about 250 different words in the corpus of Enochian texts, more than half of which occur only once. A few resemble words in the Bible – mostly proper names – in both sound and meaning. For example, luciftias "brightness" resembles Lucifer "the light-bearer"; babalond "wicked, harlot" resembles Babylon. Leitch notes a number of root words in Enochian. He lists Doh, I, Ia, Iad, among others, as likely root words. While the Angelic Keys contain most of the known vocabulary of Enochian, dozens of further words are found throughout Dee's journals.

Thousands of additional, undefined words are contained in the Liber Loagaeth. Laycock notes that the material in Liber Loagaeth appears to be different from the language of the 'Calls' found in the Angelic Keys, which appear to have been generated from the tables and squares of the Loagaeth. According to Laycock:

Dictionaries 
There have been several compilations of Enochian words made to form Enochian dictionaries. A scholarly study is Donald Laycock's The Complete Enochian Dictionary. Also useful is Vinci's Gmicalzoma: An Enochian Dictionary.

Representation of numbers 
The number system is inexplicable. It seems possible to identify the numerals from 0 to 10:
0 – T
1 – L, EL, L-O, ELO, LA, LI, LIL
2 – V, VI-I-V, VI-VI
3 – D, R
4 – S, ES
5 – O
6 – N, NORZ
7 – Q
8 – P
9 – M, EM
10 – X

However, Enochian texts contain larger numbers written in alphabetical form, and there is no discernible system behind them:

12 –  OS
19 –  AF
22 –  OP
24 –  OL
26 –  OX
28 –  OB, NI
31 –  GA
33 –  PD
42 –  VX
456 –  CLA
1000 –  MATB

1,636 –  QUAR
3,663 –  MIAN
5,678 –  DAOX
6,332 –  ERAN
6,739 –  DARG
7,336 –  TAXS
7,699 –  ACAM
8,763 –  EMOD
9,639 –  MAPM
9,996 –  CIAL
69,636 –  PEOAL

As Laycock put it, "the test of any future spirit-revelation of the Enochian language will be the explanation of this numerical system."

Relation to other languages 
Dee believed Enochian to be the Adamic language universally spoken before the confusion of tongues. However, modern analysis shows Enochian to be an English-like constructed language. Word order closely follows English, except for the dearth of articles and prepositions. The very scant evidence of Enochian verb conjugation is likewise reminiscent of English, more so than with Semitic languages such as Hebrew, which Dee said were debased versions of the Enochian language.

See also 

 List of magical terms and traditions
 Renaissance magic

Notes

References

Citations

Works cited

Primary sources

Secondary sources

Further reading 

 
 
 .
 
 
 
 
 
 

Alphabets
Constructed languages
Constructed languages introduced in the 1580s

Language and mysticism
Languages attested from the 16th century
Sacred languages